Susan Martin is a former Republican member of the North Carolina House of Representatives, who represented the 8th district (including constituents in Wilson and Pitt counties).

Career
Martin was elected on November 6, 2012. She received 57.19% of the vote while her Democratic opponent Mark Bibbs received 42.81%. In November 2017, Martin announced that she would not be running for a fourth term to the State House, due to redistricting. After retiring from the State House in 2018, Martin announced that she would be moving to Tennessee.

Electoral history

2016

2014

2012

Committee assignments

2017-2018 session
Finance (Chair)
Commerce and Job Development (Chair)
Regulatory Reform (Vice Chair)
Agriculture
Energy and Public Utilities
Elections and Ethics Law
University Board of Governors Nominating
Rules, Calendar, and Operations of the House

2015-2016 session
Finance (Chair)
Commerce and Job Development (Vice Chair)
Agriculture
Education - Universities
Health
Public Utilities
Elections
Homeland Security, Military, and Veterans Affairs

2013-2014 session
Agriculture
Appropriations
Commerce and Job Development
Education
Health and Human Services
Public Utilities and Energy
Regulatory Reform

References

External links
 
 North Carolina General Assembly page
 Profile at Vote Smart
 Financial information (state office) at the National Institute for Money in State Politics

Year of birth missing (living people)
Living people
Republican Party members of the North Carolina House of Representatives
Women state legislators in North Carolina
21st-century American politicians
21st-century American women politicians